Vasilios Dotis (born 8 February 2002) is a Greek professional footballer who plays as an attacking midfielder for Super League 2 club Irodotos.

References

2002 births
Living people
Footballers from Ioannina
Greek footballers
Greece youth international footballers
Greek expatriate footballers
Association football midfielders
MFK Zemplín Michalovce players
Irodotos FC players
Slovak Super Liga players
Super League Greece 2 players
Expatriate footballers in Slovakia
Greek expatriate sportspeople in Slovakia